Lucrezia Buti (Florence, 1435; died in the sixteenth century) was an Italian nun, and later the lover of the painter Fra Filippo Lippi. She is believed to be the model for several of Lippi's Madonnas.

Life 

Lucrezia was born in Florence in 1435, the daughter of Francesco Buti and Caterina Ciacchi. She became a nun in the Dominican monastery of Santa Margherita in Prato. According to Vasari, while a novice or boarder at the monastery, she met the painter Fra Filippo Lippi who in 1456 had been commissioned to paint a picture for the nuns' high altar. Lippi requested Buti as a model for the Virgin in the painting he was creating for them.

Lippi fell in love with Buti during her sittings for the painting and caused a great scandal by kidnapping her from a procession of the Girdle of Thomas in Prato and took her to his nearby home. Despite attempts to force her to return to the monastery, Buti remained at Lippi's house at the piazza del Duomo.

In 1457, Buti bore Lippi a son, Filippino, and in 1465 a daughter, Alessandra. Through the intervention of Cosimo de' Medici, the couple received a dispensation to marry from Pius II, but according to Vasari, Lippi declined to marry Buti.

Lucrezia is traditionally thought to be the model for Lippi's Madonna and Child, and Salome in his fresco cycle of the Stories of St. Stephen and St. John the Baptist in the cathedral of Prato.

See also
Catholic Church in Italy

References

Sources 
 Vasari, Giorgio, Lives of the Artists

15th-century Italian Roman Catholic religious sisters and nuns
Dominican nuns
Italian artists' models
1435 births
16th-century deaths
Models from Florence